The Shift may refer to:
 The Shift (film), a short film by David Trumble
 "The Shift" (song), by 10 Years, 2020
 "The Shift", a song by The Beach Boys from their album Surfin' Safari
 The Shift, a 1996 science fiction novel by George Foy
 The Shift, a 2009 video by Michael A. Goorjian
The Shift (movement), organization launched by Leilani Farha advocating a housing as a human right. See also w:fr:SHIFT
The Shift (newspaper), an independent online news platform in Malta.

See also
Shift (disambiguation)